Still waters run deep is a proverb of Latin origin. 

Still waters run deep may also refer to:

 Still Waters Run Deep (album), a 1970 album by Four Tops
 "Still Waters Run Deep", a song by The 69 Eyes from the 2002 album Paris Kills
 "Still Waters (Run Deep)", a 1997 song by the Bee Gees
 Still Waters Run Deep , a play by Tom Taylor first staged in 1855
 Still Waters Run Deep (film), a 1916 British silent film based on the play by Tom Taylor

See also
 Still Waters (disambiguation)